Saint Adolph may refer to:

 Adolph, ninth-century Spanish martyr, brother of one of the Martyrs of Córdoba
 Adolf of Osnabrück ( 1185–1222/1224), German martyr
 Adolphus Ludigo-Mkasa ( 1861–1886), Ugandan martyr